Midwestern Songs of the Americas is an album by the punk rock band Dillinger Four.  It was released in 1998.

Track listing
  "O.K. F.M. D.O.A." – 3:10
  "#51 Dick Butkus" – 2:24
  "It's a Fine Line Between the Monkey and the Robot" – 2:18
  "Portrait of the Artist As a Fucking Asshole" – 2:15
  "Twenty-One Said Three Times Quickly" – 2:50
  "Super Powers Enable Me to Blend in With Machinery" – 2:09
  "Doublewhiskeycokenoice" – 2:20
  "Supermodels Don't Drink Colt .45" – 2:42
  "Shut Your Little Trap, Inc." – 2:30
  "Mosh for Jesus" – 2:13
  "Hand Made Hard Times Handed Back" – 1:41
  ""Honey, I Shit the Hot Tub"" – 1:41
  "The Great American Going Out of Business Sale" – 3:38

References

1998 albums
Dillinger Four albums
Hopeless Records albums